Kennedy Paige McMann (born October 30, 1996) is an American actress known for portraying the character Nancy Drew in the 2019 television series of the same name.

Early life
McMann was born in Holland, Michigan, the daughter of Matthew and author Lisa McMann. She moved with her family to Arizona during her mid-elementary school years. She graduated in 2014 from Skyline High School where she was named one of Mesa Public Schools' five inaugural Students of the Month honorees during her senior year on November 12, 2013. McMann earned a Bachelor of Fine Arts in Acting from Carnegie Mellon University in 2018.

Career
In February 2019, McMann was signed as the titular character Nancy Drew on 2019 TV series, Nancy Drew. In January 2020, the series was renewed for a second season. Its third season premiered on October 8, 2021. McMann has also appeared on The Wayne Ayers Podcast.

Personal life
McMann married her longtime boyfriend Sam McInerney in 2020. They met as fellow students at Carnegie Mellon University.

Filmography

References

External links
 

21st-century American actresses
American television actresses
Living people
1996 births
SAG-AFTRA people
People with obsessive–compulsive disorder